Miss America 1959, the 32nd Miss America pageant, was held at the Boardwalk Hall in Atlantic City, New Jersey on September 6, 1958 on CBS.

Mary Ann Mobley, the first winner from Mississippi, became an actress, featured in two Elvis Presley films and many television series. Second runner-up Anita Bryant later gained fame as a singer and television spokesperson.

Results

Awards

Preliminary awards

Other awards

Contestants

External links
 Miss America official website

1959
1958 in the United States
1959 beauty pageants
1958 in New Jersey
September 1958 events in the United States
Events in Atlantic City, New Jersey